Zhang Chen (born ) is a Chinese volleyball player. He is part of the China men's national volleyball team. On club level he plays for Jiangsu.

Zhang Changning is his younger half-sister. They have different biological mothers.

References

External links
 profile at FIVB.org

Volleyball players from Jiangsu
Chinese men's volleyball players
Sportspeople from Jiangsu
Volleyball players at the 2010 Asian Games
Volleyball players at the 2014 Asian Games
Volleyball players at the 2018 Asian Games
1985 births
Living people
Asian Games competitors for China
21st-century Chinese people